First Aberdeen is the main bus company operator in Aberdeen, Scotland. It is a subsidiary of FirstGroup.

History

Aberdeen Corporation
Aberdeen Corporation Tramways was formed on 26 August 1898. The company was renamed Aberdeen Corporation Transport Department when it became solely a bus operator with trams ceasing on 3 May 1958.

Grampian Regional Transport

Under local government reorganisation in 1975, the Aberdeen Corporation bus operations transferred to Grampian Regional Transport, a department of the Grampian Regional Authority.

To comply with the Transport Act 1985, Grampian Regional Transport was incorporated in 1986, with the Grampian Regional Authority retaining ownership.

In January 1989 the company was privatised under an employee stock ownership plan led by its general manager Moir Lockhead. At the time GRT operated a fleet of 200 buses and 500 employees.

Unlike future similar sales in the UK, the sale of Grampian Regional Transport was done voluntarily by the council which had no overall majority party and had no deep rooted objection to the sale. At the time, councils could negotiate privately with single buyers, rather than the later practice of competitive bidding. It was a sale of a going concern, rather than as seen in other areas in later years, a distress sale, or a forced sale for political reasons.

First Grampian
While the company continued to operate as GRT in Aberdeen, its holding company  GRT Bus Group expanded through acquisition purchasing six former nationalised bus companies in England and Scotland. In April 1994 GRT Bus Group became a public limited company. In April 1995 FirstBus was formed through the merger of the Badgerline and GRT Bus Groups, with fleets in England, Wales and Scotland. Aberdeen was selected as the headquarters.

In February 1998 Grampian Regional Transport was rebranded as First Aberdeen.

Liveries

Aberdeen Corporation had a dark green and white livery, later becoming pea-green and cream. Council owned Grampian Regional Transport changed this livery, by removing the upper green band, replacing it with a thinner orange band, with Grampian fleetnames and a council crest. When privatised, a scheme with a larger area of cream base colour, supplemented by a two-tone green stripe pattern was adopted.

The cream base and stripe layout would become the corporate livery for the GRT Group, albeit with different colours for the stripes. The First Grampian livery consisted of the existing livery, with the fleetname changed to the FirstBus corporate style with the stylised f symbol. FirstGroup corporate livery was adopted in 1998 upon being rebranded as First Aberdeen.

Fleet

A mainstay of the fleet in the 1970s up to 1983 was the Alexander AL Type bodied Leyland Atlantean, supplemented by the Leyland National single-decker bus. In 1985 it moved to Alexander RH bodied Leyland Olympian double-deckers until 1988. From 1991 to 1997 the company steadily bought the Mercedes-Benz O405 single-decker.

Grampian Regional Transport was one of the first UK users of articulated buses. Aberdeen is one of the major locations for articulated buses in the United Kingdom with around 35 in the fleet in December 2013.

As of March 2013 the fleet consisted of 173 buses and coaches.

In 2014, the firm purchased 26 Wright StreetLite micro-hybrid buses.

First Aberdeen were the world's first operator of double-decker hydrogen fuel cell buses, taking delivery of 15 Wright StreetDeck Hydroliners in January 2021. These were initially taken off the road in January 2022 due to technical faults and were temporarily replaced with Euro VI diesel buses loaned from First Glasgow. The first of these returned to service in April 2022. 10 more joined the fleet in April 2022, bringing the total fleet of Hydroliners to 25.

Daytime Services

A Metro network was introduced on 13 May 2001 as a series of colour-coded high-frequency routes with the promise of no reduction in services in the following three years. In September 2004, a small number of services were withdrawn and minor revisions were made to some existing services.

Metro was later renamed the Overground network in line with other FirstGroup companies. This was a group wide initiative to rationalise route networks into high frequency colour-coded networks running on main routes, to reduce the amount of confusing overlaps and divergences of routes on minor roads.

In 2008, First Aberdeen revamped their entire network axing little used services and focusing on the Overground routes. The required 90% of Aberdeen's timetable to be changed.

On 16 September 2012 First has been introducing a network review of services which is the biggest service change since 2008. The review reduces frequency on most routes. It also removes evening and Sunday services to parts of the city..

Revenue
Most First Aberdeen services are operated commercially, an exception to this is the council subsidised Service 40 which operates from Guild Street to Dubford on Sundays. The company operates an exact fare policy, whereby no change is given by the driver, though they also allow contactless payment along with payment through the First Bus app on the Android and iOS mobile operating systems. The fleet was one of two divisions in FirstBus picked to trial the new "ticketer" ticket machines at the start of 2017.

King Street Headquarters
The company has occupied a historic depot site at 395 King Street at the heart of the city since 1914. It was built in 1862 and bought by Aberdeen Corporation Tramways The site has also served as global headquarters of FirstGroup since its formation in 1995. On 21 June 2007 First gained permission to redevelop the site into a new Aberdeen bus depot and global FirstGroup headquarters building. It was officially opened by Anne, Princess Royal on 15 July 2010.

See also
List of bus operators of the United Kingdom
Transport in Aberdeen

References

External links

Company website

Bus operators in Scotland
FirstGroup companies